René Mioch (born in Waalwijk, March 6, 1959) is a Dutch journalist and presenter for radio and television. He has had several minor film roles, mainly as cameos of himself, including appearances in Loverboy and Too Fat Too Furious. In 2006, he was elected as a member of the International Academy of Television Arts and Sciences.

External sources

References

1959 births
Living people
Dutch radio personalities
Dutch television presenters
People from Waalwijk
20th-century Dutch people